Camille Hédouin (born 1986)  
better known as Mounqup is a French-Galician, singer-songwriter. Her musical style has been labeled as a mix of jazz and electronic music, although she defines herself as a "rural electronic vocalist".

Early life and education
Hédouin was born in Nantes, France. After getting her degree in Biology in 2011, she arrived in Galicia to help in  the recuperation of the village of Soumede, in the council of Bola.

Career
In 2017 she received the Narf Award. In that same year she released her first album Proba de son, recorded by herself and mixed and mastered by the drummer of Belöp.

In June, 2018 she released her second album Castro Verdi

Personal life
Hédouin resides in the ourensan village of  Gontán, Verea.

Discography
Proba de son (Molho, 2017)
Castro Verdi (Molho, 2018)

References

External links

Living people
Art pop musicians
Avant-garde singers
French electronic musicians
French pop singers
Singers from Galicia (Spain)
French songwriters
Musicians from Nantes
French experimental musicians
Avant-pop musicians
Women in electronic music
21st-century French singers
French women singer-songwriters
French singer-songwriters
21st-century French women singers
1986 births
Date of birth missing (living people)
21st-century Spanish singers